Abacetus aeratus is a species of ground beetle in the subfamily Pterostichinae. It was described by Tschitscherine in 1900 and is an endemic species found in Vietnam, Asia.

References

aeratus
Beetles described in 1900
Insects of Southeast Asia